Mordellistena parvula is a species of beetle in the genus Mordellistena of the family Mordellidae. It was described by Gyllenhal in 1827 and can be found in countries like Albania, Bosnia and Herzegovina, Bulgaria, Czech Republic, Germany, Hungary, Italy and North Macedonia.

References

Beetles described in 1827
parvula
Beetles of Europe